The 2001 Tennessee Volunteers football team represented the University of Tennessee in the 2001 NCAA Division I-A football season. The team was coached by Phillip Fulmer.  The Vols played their home games in Neyland Stadium and competed in the Eastern Division of the Southeastern Conference (SEC). The Vols finished the season 10–2, 7–1 in SEC play and won the Florida Citrus Bowl, 45–17, over Michigan.

Schedule

Originally scheduled for September 15, the UT-UF game (along with all sporting events that weekend) was postponed to a later date due to the September 11th Attacks.

Personnel

Roster

Coaching staff
 Phillip Fulmer – Head coach
 John Chavis – Defensive coordinator
 Randy Sanders – Offensive coordinator

2002 NFL Draft
The 2002 NFL Draft was held on April 20–21, 2002 at The Theater at Madison Square Garden in New York City.  The following UT players were selected:

References

Tennessee
Tennessee Volunteers football seasons
Citrus Bowl champion seasons
Tennessee Volunteers football